Forage may refer to:

Forage, plant material (mainly plant leaves and stems) eaten by grazing livestock
Forage (honey bee), bees' food supply consisting of nectar and pollen from blooming plants

See also
Foraging or Foraging theory, a topic in the behavioural ecology of animals
Forage War, a partisan war of many small skirmishes that took place in New Jersey, USA during the American Revolutionary War in 1777
Forage fish, small fish which are preyed on by larger predators for food
Forager (disambiguation)